Calliderma is an extinct genus of sea stars in the family Goniasteridae. Species are known from the Cretaceous to the Eocene.

See also 
 List of prehistoric echinoderm genera
 List of prehistoric starfish

References

External links 

 
 

Prehistoric starfish genera
Goniasteridae